State Road 884 (SR 884), along with County Road 884 (CR 884), together create Lee County, Florida's primary east–west partially controlled access highway, linking Cape Coral in the western portion of the county to Lehigh Acres and Alva in the eastern portion. The highway runs through the southern incorporated limits of the city of Fort Myers and through the mid part of Cape Coral, and has become a major commuter route.

Route description

County Road 884 (Cape Coral and Fort Myers)
County Road 884 begins in Cape Coral as Veterans Parkway, a limited-access highway, heading south from the intersection with SR 78 and then turning east, with an interchange at Del Prado Boulevard (County Road 867A).  After crossing the Caloosahatchee River on the Midpoint Bridge into Fort Myers the highway, it is known as Colonial Boulevard, a controlled-access road.  Following intersections with McGregor Boulevard (SR 867), and Summerlin Road (CR 869), it has an interchange at Cleveland Avenue (Tamiami Trail-U.S. Route 41), where it becomes State Road 884.

State Road 884
State Road 884 begins at the eastern end of the Tamiami Trail intersection, heading east through the southern end of Fort Myers.  The route intersects State Road 739 (Metro Parkway) and passes by the Calusa Nature Center and Planetarium before interchanging with Interstate 75 west of Lehigh Acres.  State Road 884 officially ends just east of I-75 at Dynasty Drive.

County Road 884 (Lehigh Acres and Alva)
The eastern half of CR 884 begins where SR 884 left off, heading east towards an intersection with SR 82 in Lehigh Acres, and becomes Lee Boulevard.  It eventually becomes Leeland Heights Boulevard before turning north on Joel Boulevard.  The road terminates at an intersection with Palm Beach Boulevard (SR 80) near Alva.

History
The full length of State Road 884 was completed by the late 1970s to connect the area to the then-newly constructed Interstate 75, where it terminated at the time.

In the mid-1970s, Florida Department of Transportation designated the segment east of State Road 82 to Palm Beach Boulevard (State Road 80) as secondary state roads.  At the time, Lee Boulevard and Leeland Heights Boulevard were designated State Road 82B while Joel Boulevard was part of State Road 873 (a designation which also continued south down Alabama Road).  They were eventually redesignated County Road 884 when Colonial Boulevard was extended beyond Interstate 75 to connect with Lee Boulevard at SR 82 in the late 1980s, creating a continuous route. .

At the other end, CR 884 was extended east of McGregor Boulevard into Cape Coral with the completion of the Midpoint Memorial Bridge and Veterans Parkway in 1997.

In the late 2000s, improvements were planned for the corridor between Chiquita Boulevard and I-75, which included overpasses and express lanes.   The plans were abandoned due to local opposition.

Major intersections

References

External links

884
884
884
Transportation in Fort Myers, Florida
Cape Coral, Florida
1970s establishments in Florida